The Mimico Mountaineers or Mimico Lacrosse Club is a Jr. A box lacrosse association in Toronto, Ontario, Canada.  The Mountaineers operate junior-age and younger teams. Their home arena is Mimico Arena in the Mimico neighbourhood of Toronto.  Beginning in 2015, their primary junior team will be a member of the Ontario Junior A Lacrosse League. From 1993 until 2014, the Mountaineers were members of the Ontario Junior B Lacrosse League.

History

The Mimico Lacrosse Club was established in 1890 as a field lacrosse organization. In 1931, when the Canadian Lacrosse Association chose the  box lacrosse game as its new form of play, the Mimico Lacrosse Club built an outdoor box at the corner of Church Street (Royal York) and Drummond Street, where the game has been played continuously until today. The Mountaineers won the Mann Cup in 1932 and 1942, and Eastern Canadian Senior titles in 1943 and 1947. In World War II, Conn Smythe's 30th Light Anti-aircraft Battery, dubbed "The Sportsmen's Battery", included every member of the Mimico Mountaineers who won the 1942 Mann Cup. Minto Cup victories were also recorded in 1938 and 1951, with Eastern Canadian championships in 1941 and 1946.

1993-: Since the expansion in 1993 with the Nepean Knights, the Mimico Mountaineers never really wavered from "average", and lacked consistency between 1993-2000. Between 2001-2010 there had been noticeable improvement, but ultimately even during this time of success the Mountaineers found themselves bowing out in the early stages of the playoffs.  Mimico then once again found themselves near the bottom of the league between 2011-2014; their final four years in the Jr. B Association.

2006: The Mountaineer line-up for the 2006 season included 10 rookies and the team went the furthest it has even been into the playoffs.  The 2006 season was a somewhat landmark year for the Mountaineers, as they made the playoff semi-finals. After defeating the Clarington Green Gaels 3 games to 1 and the Barrie Tornado in the quarter-finals 3 games to 1, the Mountaineers quietly exited the playoffs via 3–0 sweep to the eventual Founders Cup champions, the Oakville Buzz.

2014: On June 26, 2014 the Jr. B Mountaineers amalgamated with the Mississauga Tomahawks of the Ontario Junior A Lacrosse League.  The Jr. B Mountaineers program will no longer operate following the 2014 season.  The Jr. B Tomahawks become the official affiliate of the Jr. A Mountaineers, beginning in 2015.

2015: In their first Jr. A season, the Mountaineers finished a respectable 10th in the OLA-A; finishing above last place St. Catherines Athletics.  This was the first season for the Mountaineers in Jr. A lacrosse since 1978.  The last time the Tomahawks/Mountaineers franchise won five games in a season was back in 2007; wherein the Tomahawks as well finished in 10th place.  This season, the Mimico Mountaineers won more games than the entire Tomahawks franchise did over the past five seasons; a strong indication of some early success for the Jr. A Mountaineers.

2016: The Mountaineers finish a surprising 4th in the OLA-A.  This marks the first time since 1978 that the Mountaineers will compete in the Jr. A playoffs, and the first time since 2000 that the newly amalgamated Mississauga/Mimico franchise as a whole will participate in the playoffs.  This is a huge step for the Mountaineers organization, who won 12 of their 20 regular season games, including an 8-2 home record.  Impressively, the Mountaineers swept the Burlington Chiefs 3-0 in the Quarterfinals; however, they too would be swept themselves by the Six Nations Arrows, 4-0 in the Semifinals.

Season-by-season results
Note: GP = Games played, W = Wins, L = Losses, T = Ties, Pts = Points, GF = Goals for, GA = Goals against

Previous franchise

Founders Cup
CANADIAN NATIONAL CHAMPIONSHIPS

References

External links
Mimico Lacrosse website

Ontario Lacrosse Association teams
Lacrosse teams in Toronto
Lacrosse clubs established in 1993
1993 establishments in Ontario